Bram van Eijk (born 19 October 1996) is a Dutch football player who plays for Capelle.

Club career
Van Eijk played in the Feyenoord academy and joined FC Utrecht in 2015. He made his professional debut in the Eerste Divisie for Jong FC Utrecht on 19 August 2016 in a game against De Graafschap.

He joined amateur side VV Capelle in summer 2017.

References

External links
 

1996 births
Living people
Footballers from Schiedam
Association football fullbacks
Dutch footballers
Netherlands youth international footballers
Jong FC Utrecht players
VV Capelle players
Eerste Divisie players